The Deciates (Δεκιήταις) were a Ligurian tribe dwelling near on the Mediterranean coast, around present-day Antibes, during the Iron Age and the Roman era.

According to historian Guy Barruol, they were part of the Saluvian confederation.

Name 
They are mentioned as Dekiḗtais (Δεκιήταις) by Polybius (2nd c. BC), and as Dekiatíōn (Δεκιατίων) by Ptolemy (2nd c. AD). A regio Deciatium is also attested by Pliny (1st c. AD), and an oppidum Deciatum is documented by Pomponius Mela (mid-1st c. AD).

The meaning of the name Deciates remains obscure. According to Javier de Hoz, an Indo-European etymology, from the root *dek̑-, is possible, and the suffix -ates may be evidence of a Celtic transmission, "but the whole name does not seem to be Celtic. In this case I would accept a classification as 'restricted Ligurian' because of the people's geographical location."

Geography 
The Deciates dwelled on the Mediterranean coast, west of the river Loup, around the Massaliote colony of Antipolis (modern Antibes). Their territory was located south of the Nerusii, southeast of the Ligauni, and either east or west of the Oxybii.

The exact location of the oppidum Deciatum (or Dekieton) remains uncertain. It is possible that it was not a separate place between Nicaea and Antipolis, but simply a name for Antipolis itself.

The coastal Greek colony of Antipolis (modern Antibes), founded in their territory in the mid-3rd century BC, was probably a Graecization of the original name given by the Ligurians to the place, despite the literal Greek meaning of 'city opposite'. This does not necessarily imply that it had been the main centre of the Deciates, and Barruol has proposed to identify the site of Grasse as their chief town.

History 
In 154 BC, the Ligurians besieged the Massaliote colonies of Nicaea (Nice) and Antipolis. Upon a request from Massalia, and after a Roman legate Flaminius had been injured by the Oxybii, the Roman Senate sent the consul Quintus Opimius to pacify the region. The latter defeated the Deciates and the Oxybii at Aegitna, then handed over a great part of their territory to Massalia.

References

Primary sources

Bibliography

Further reading 
Cosson, Pierre (1995) Civitas Antipolitana: Histoire du Municipe Romain d'Antipolis.Nice, Serre Editeur. 
Pliny the Elder, Chorographia, II.69

Ligures